The Raziano House, also known as Mahogany Manor, is a historic house located at 913 Minor Street in Kenner, Louisiana.

Built in 1946 for Henry Raziano and his wife Amelia, the house is a two-story brick residence in the Colonial Revival style.

The house was listed on the National Register of Historic Places on August 14, 1998.

See also
 National Register of Historic Places listings in Jefferson Parish, Louisiana

References

Houses on the National Register of Historic Places in Louisiana
Neoclassical architecture in Louisiana
Houses completed in 1946
Houses in Jefferson Parish, Louisiana